Bingley railway station is a grade II listed railway station that serves the town of Bingley in West Yorkshire, England, and is  away from Leeds and  away from Bradford Forster Square on the Airedale line operated by Northern Trains.

History
The Leeds and Bradford Railway opened the Leeds and Bradford Extension Railway from Shipley to Keighley on 16 March 1847. Bingley station opened on the first day, and remained the only intermediate station until Saltaire was built in 1856.

The original station was near the Three Rise Locks on the Leeds and Liverpool Canal, but the Midland Railway (who had absorbed the L&BR in 1851) closed the old station and opened the current station on 24 July 1892. The second station was designed by Charles Trubshaw, who was a Midland Railway architect. The goods yard and accompanying shed, were located to the north of the station on the down side of the running lines. The shed, which is now in private hands, was taken out of railway use in 1965 and like the station is now grade II listed.

The bog north of Bingley station was a headache to the railway builders. It is recorded in the Bradford Observer of 8 March 1847 that "no fewer than 100,000 cubic yards of solid earth and stone have been poured into this insatiable maw of a bog." The bog has also claimed some of Bingley Grammar School's buildings and the sinking may have given rise to an urban legend about a locomotive and wagons having been swallowed up by the bog. No evidence can be found to attest to this.

Immediately south of the station is Bingley Tunnel ( long) against which a semaphore signal was placed for movements towards Shipley. When the line was electrified in 1994, the semaphore signalling was replaced with colour lights at the same time. The tunnel mouth at Bingley had a painted white patch on it directly behind the semaphore arm, thereby allowing greater recognition for drivers of the signal's position.

Stationmasters

John Wilkinson 1846 - 1848 (afterwards station master at Shipley) 
Joseph Heaton until 1862
F. Cavanah 1862 - 1864
A. Wilcock from 1864
Charles Darnell ca. 1870 - 1874
George Alfred Wright 1874 - 1884 (afterwards station master at St Albans)
W. Brown 1874 - 1890
William Grundy 1890 - 1913
Joseph Hartley 1913 - 1928
W. Parrington 1928 - 1931
Wallace Raymond Graham 1931 - 1938 (formerly station master at Earby)
Frederick Orbell 1938 - 1942 (formerly station master at Oxenhope)
L. Hamer 1942 - 1953
Frank Sutcliffe 1953 - 1956 (formerly station master at Fitzwilliam and Nostell, afterwards station master at Hebden Bridge)
E. Riggot from 1956

Accidents 
Three wagons were completely destroyed whilst a fourth wagon and the locomotive were badly damaged.

In 2013, an unoccupied car ended up on the line just south of Bingley station and was hit at 8:45 pm by a Leeds to Skipton service.

Facilities
The station is staffed part-time (except evenings and Sundays) - the booking office is sited in the main entrance at street level and is linked to the platforms via ramps, footbridge and a lift. Ticket machines are also provided.  There are waiting rooms on each platform, with passenger information screens and PA system offering train running information.

Services

On Sundays there is an hourly service to Leeds and to Bradford Forster Square, with two trains per hour in the other direction to Skipton.  The Bradford to Skipton timetable was increased from its former two-hourly frequency at the December 2017 timetable change.

See also
Listed buildings in Bingley

References
Railways Through Airedale & Wharfedale. Martin Bairstow (2004)

External links

Railway stations in Bradford
DfT Category D stations
Former Midland Railway stations
Railway stations in Great Britain opened in 1847
Railway stations in Great Britain closed in 1892
Railway stations in Great Britain opened in 1892
Northern franchise railway stations
Buildings and structures in Bingley
1847 establishments in England
Charles Trubshaw railway stations
Grade II listed buildings in West Yorkshire